Chalk End is a hamlet in the civil parish of Roxwell and the Chelmsford District of Essex, England.

References 
 
Essex A-Z (page 23)

Hamlets in Essex
City of Chelmsford